The 1928 Nevada Wolf Pack football team was an American football team that represented the University of Nevada in the Far Western Conference (FWC) during the 1928 college football season. In their fourth and final season under head coach Buck Shaw, the team compiled a 0–7–1 record (0–3–1 FWC) and finished last in the conference.

Schedule

References

Nevada
Nevada Wolf Pack football seasons
College football winless seasons
Nevada Wolf Pack football